Samuel Harris (born 20 April 1934) is a Pakistani boxer. He competed in the men's flyweight event at the 1956 Summer Olympics. At the 1956 Summer Olympics, he lost to Terence Spinks of Great Britain in his first bout of the tournament in the Round of 32.

References

External links
 

1934 births
Living people
Pakistani male boxers
Olympic boxers of Pakistan
Boxers at the 1956 Summer Olympics
Place of birth missing (living people)
Flyweight boxers